Cole is a town in McClain County, Oklahoma, United States. The population was 555 at the 2010 census.

History 
The town was named Cole after it was decided Cunningham was too long a name. Cole's first post office, created in 1912, was in the Cunningham home, though it was moved later to Read's General Merchandise Store.

Geography
Cole is located at  (35.105921, -97.572964).

Cole is located along State Highway 74B.

Demographics

As of the census of 2000, there were 473 people, 169 households, and 141 families living in the town. There were 183 housing units at an average density of 12.1 per square mile (4.7/km2). The racial makeup of the town was 90.27% White, 0.21% African American, 6.55% Native American, 0.63% from other races, and 2.33% from two or more races. Hispanic or Latino of any race were 2.75% of the population.

There were 169 households, out of which 40.2% had children under the age of 18 living with them, 71.0% were married couples living together, 4.7% had a female householder with no husband present, and 16.0% were non-families. 13.0% of all households were made up of individuals, and 4.1% had someone living alone who was 65 years of age or older. The average household size was 2.80 and the average family size was 2.99.

In the town, the population was spread out, with 27.1% under the age of 18, 8.5% from 18 to 24, 30.0% from 25 to 44, 25.6% from 45 to 64, and 8.9% who were 65 years of age or older. The median age was 36 years. For every 100 females, there were 101.3 males. For every 100 females age 18 and over, there were 104.1 males.

The median income for a household in the town was $40,588, and the median income for a family was $41,750. Males had a median income of $29,732 versus $18,542 for females. The per capita income for the town was $14,474. About 10.2% of families and 10.0% of the population were below the poverty line, including 12.9% of those under age 18 and 11.6% of those age 65 or over.

References

External links
 Encyclopedia of Oklahoma History and Culture - Cole

Towns in McClain County, Oklahoma
Towns in Oklahoma